The Quality Council of India (QCI) was set up as a public private partnership model on the model existing in Netherlands at the time, where although the NAB was not owned by the government, yet it was supported by it and was exceedingly used as a third party agency to improve quality in departments and industry. QCI thus, came to be organized as an independent autonomous body that worked towards assuring quality standards across all spheres of economic and social activities. Key industry associations, i.e. Associated Chambers of Commerce and Industry of India (ASSOCHAM), Confederation of Indian Industry(CII) and Federation of Indian Chambers of Commerce and Industry (FICCI) became the promoters of the organizers and QCI got established under the Societies Registration Act in 1996 to provide accreditation services in various sectors for product, services and persons.

The Council is independent and works under the directions of its Governing Body (GB) having equal representation of government, industry and industry associations. It does not get funded by the government and is a self-sustaining non-profit organization with its own Memorandum of Association (MOA) and Rules. Its current Chairman is Mr. Jaxay Shah and the Executive Head (Secretary General) is Dr Ravi P Singh. Chairman of QCI is nominated by the Hon’ble Prime Minister of India and is a non-executive post.

History

Post liberalization, India embarked on a process of creating the quality infrastructure in the country which can help Indian products and services easy access to foreign markets in the new order under WTO regime. In the process, an organization was sought to be established which would function as the National Accreditation body (NAB). The responsibility to set up the organization was given to the then Department of Industries (now Department for Promotion of Industry and Internal Trade (DPIIT)).

A committee of relevant ministries, governing bodies, and industry stakeholders was formulated in 1992 to propose suitable recommendations that can take form as an industry body. The Department of Industrial Policy and Promotion oversaw the process and the final recommendations were submitted to the Union Council of Ministers (Cabinet) in 1996.

Key recommendations included:
 need for establishing an organisation jointly run by the Government of India in conjuncture with relevant industries
 need for this organisation to be self-sustaining

Cabinet Committee accepted these and gave its approval to register a new autonomous body, Quality Council of India, under Societies Registration Act, 1860.

Project Planning & Implementation Division (PPID)
With a view of propagating a culture of quality, Adil Zainulbhai, the past Chairman of QCI, has been instrumental in modifying the council and creating a young and talented workforce.
Since its inception in 2015, the Project Planning & Implementation Division has focused on solving the key issues of the government with the help of a young team. It received its first project in September from the senior bureaucracy to work with 20 central ministries to improve the servicing by examining the public’s grievances.  The work includes project management, monitoring the performances of various cells, data analytics and tactical research. 
The key responsibilities include creating timelines and assessing the requirement of the plans, coordination with the stake-holders, methodology formulation and the overall execution and mobilization of the projects.

Major schemes and initiatives:

Swachh Bharat Abhiyan – QCI held surveys regarding the progress of the initiative. 
Pradhan Mantri Kaushal Vikas Yojna

Projects

Swachh Survekshan

Quality Council of India had been commissioned by the Ministry of Urban Development to conduct an extensive survey to measure the success rate of Swachh Bharat Mission. Under ‘Swachh Survekshan 2016’, QCI released hygiene rankings of 73 cities, including Tier 1 and Tier 2 as per Classification of Indian cities.

25 teams of 3 trained surveyors each visited 42 locations covering highly populated zones like railway stations, bus stands, marketplaces, religious places, residential zones and toilet complexes. 3, 066 geo tagged photos were collected as evidence.

The second edition of Swachh Survekshan 2017 ranked 434 cities from January 4 to February 7, 2017.

Top 10 cleanest cities 2017: 

Bottom 10 cities 2017: 

Top 10 cleanest cities 2016: 

Bottom 10 cities 2016: 

Yoga Scheme

In 2016, Quality Council of India introduced a voluntary certification for to assure standardised yoga practices across the world.

Along with the yoga scheme, QCI also runs a certification for Yoga Training Schools. With objective of raising the standard of training professionals graduating from these institutions.
Over 18, 500 aspirants registered under the scheme, 6, 000 examined and over 900 yoga professionals have been certified.

A Memorandum of Understanding has been signed with Peru, Bolivia and Japan for promotion of certified yoga practices. Currently, it is in talks with Malaysia, Poland, Russia and Australia for such tie-ups.

MSME registration under ZED

Prime Minister of India, Narendra Modi, initiated the Zero Defect Zero Effect (ZED) model in 2016 as an integral component of Make in India. The model was conceptualised to help Ministry of Micro, Small and Medium Enterprises improve quality and environmental standards to prevent return of goods after manufacturing.

A flagship project of QCI, aims to certify over 1.25 Million MSMEs within five years to match international quality standards.

e-Quest

On 23 May 2017, QCI launched an e-learning certification in line with the government’s Digital India campaign to accredit manufacturers. The courses include Total Quality Management, Total Productive Maintenance and Manufacturing competitiveness. It enables entrepreneurs to gain certification in functional areas of manufacturing and quality practices.

Active Projects:

ZED  
Scheme For Voluntary Certification Of Yoga Professionals  
Indian Certification for Medical Devices (ICMED)  Scheme  
INDIA Good Agriculture Practices (INDGAP) Certification Scheme  
Voluntary Certification Scheme for Lead Safe Paints (VCSLSP)  
Traditional Health Practitioners Certification Scheme (THP)  
Capacity Building Program for Voluntary Consumer Organizations  
Ready Mix Concrete Plant Certification Scheme (RMCPCS)  
Attestation of Courseware for IT ITeS SSC  
QCI Scheme for Approval of Emergency Response Disaster Management Plans (ERDMP) under PNGRB Regulations  
Voluntary Certification Scheme for AYUSH Products  
Voluntary Certification Scheme for Medicinal Plant Produce (VCSMPP)  
FSSAI Initiative – Tasty Food Safe Food

Associated Ministries

Ministry of Urban Development 
Ministry of Drinking Water and Sanitation 
Ministry of Skill Development and Entrepreneurship  
State Government of Gujarat 
National Skills Development Corporation  
Ministry of Human Resources Development  
National Council for Teacher Education 
Ministry of Petroleum and Natural Gas 
Ministry of Railways 
NITI Aayog (erstwhile planning commission of India)  
Ministry of New and Renewable Energy 
Department of Administrative Reform and Public Grievances (DARPG)

Board Composition

Chairperson (appointed by prime minister of India)  
Immediate Past Chairperson 
Secretary General-Quality Council of India  
Indian Medical Association 
Consumer Co-ordination Council 
Insurance Regulatory & Development Authority (IRDA)  
Indian Nursing Council 
Secretary, Ministry of AYUSH (erstwhile Department of AYUSH)  
Director General, Armed Forces Medical Services  
Directorate General of Health Services (DGHS), MOHFW  
Dean, Maulana Azad Medical College, New Delhi 
Secretary, Ministry of Tourism 
Drugs Controller General of India 
Chair, Health Committee – CII 
Chair, Health Committee – ASSOCHAM 
Chair, Health Committee – FICCI 
Academy of Hospital Administration (AHA)  
President, State Medical Council (currently Delhi State)  
Consortium of Accredited Healthcare Organizations (CAHO)  
Chair, Accreditation Committee – NABH  
Chair, Hospital Technical Committee – NABH  
Chair, Appeals Committee – NABH  
CEO NABH – Member Secretary

Boards

A 38-member council governs QCI, which is responsible for formulating strategy, general policies and monitoring various components including the accreditation boards. The council ensures transparency and credibility amongst the entire system.

QCI functions through 5 main accreditation boards:

National Accreditation Board for Certification Bodies (NABCB)

The board confers accreditations to various certification bodies. It follows the ISO: 17011 guidelines for accreditation. As per the appropriate international criterion, NABCB is a part of the international structure of certification and inspection bodies. The board identifies requirements for the competence of the bodies executing inspection. Additionally, it ensures neutral and steady activities of inspection.

National Accreditation Board for Education and Training (NABET)

NABET is responsible for granting accreditation to schools and institutes providing vocational training and recognizing their competence & capability in Education.  It’s supposedly one of the biggest boards under QCI in terms of impacting numerous lives. It ensures that the education standards cope with the demand and supply of working professional nationally and internationally. It undertakes the enhancement of the teaching and learning processes and improving the evaluation methods by inculcating national curricular objectives in schooling process and structure through accreditation. With an elaborate structure and emphasis on training, the board addresses the areas of major concerns in the education sector.

National Board for Quality Promotion (NBQP)

The board primarily endorses cognizance on standards such as QMS, EMS, FSMS, ISMS etc. as well as tools of quality. Consequently, it empowers businesses to compete for better quality standards. The board currently consists of 26 members and one of the main motives is to achieve the main objective of QCI to facilitate National Quality Campaign. The National Board for Quality Promotion is re-formed every four years and will include Federation of Indian Small and Micro & Medium Enterprises (FISME). The tools help the industries to follow to the code of conduct, quality standards and deal with the challenges.

National Accreditation Board for Hospitals & Healthcare Providers (NABH)

Established in 2006, NABH establishes and operates accreditation programs for healthcare organizations. It has gradually introduced new standards for the smaller hospitals that find it difficult to cope with the full standards of NABH.

National Accreditation Board for Testing and Calibration Laboratories (NABL)

NABL is registered under Societies Registration Act, 1860. The purpose of the board is to provide the Industry and Government with third-party schemes for the assessment of the technical competence and quality of pertaining bodies. Apart from being their signatory for accreditation of Testing, connections with International Accreditation Co-operation (ILAC) and Asia Pacific Laboratory Accreditation Co-operation (APLAC) are maintained by NABL.

D.L. Shah Award

Started in 2007, The QCI D.L Shah award recognizes achievements in refining products & services and improved customer service. Open to all types of organizations, they’re allowed to submit a maximum of 3 projects. The prerequisites include that the organization should be registered in India and free of convictions from the judiciary. The award is divided into the following categories depending on specific requirements:

Platinum Award
Gold Award
Silver Award 

2017 marks the 11th edition of the D.L. Shah award for successful projects in production operation and service and customer/stakeholder satisfaction.

References

Councils of India